Gary Louis Pettigrew (October 10, 1944 – January 21, 2023) was an American football defensive lineman in the National Football League (NFL) for the Philadelphia Eagles and New York Giants.  He played college football at Stanford University and was drafted in the second round of the 1966 NFL Draft.  Pettigrew was also selected in the sixth round of the 1966 AFL Draft by the San Diego Chargers.

Pettigrew died after a long battle with myelodysplastic syndrome on January 21, 2023, at the age of 78.

References

1944 births
2023 deaths
Canadian players of American football
American football defensive linemen
Sportspeople from British Columbia
Sportspeople from Vancouver
Philadelphia Eagles players
Stanford Cardinal football players
Canadian emigrants to the United States
New York Giants players
Players of American football from Spokane, Washington
Gridiron football people from British Columbia